Manulea vakulenkoi is a moth of the family Erebidae. It is found in Russia (Taimyr, north-eastern Jakutia, Transbaicalia).

References

Moths described in 1990
Lithosiina